NWA All Star Wrestling (sometimes referred to as NWA Vancouver) is a Canadian professional wrestling promotion, based in Vancouver, British Columbia. All-Star Wrestling folded in 1989 but returned in 2007 no longer affiliated with the National Wrestling Alliance Mark Vellios is the current owner.

History

Early history
Although other wrestling promotions existed in Vancouver prior to the early 1960s (particularly a predecessor of All Star's called Big Time Wrestling), All Star (an affiliate of the National Wrestling Alliance (NWA) for most of its existence) became the longest-lived and perhaps best-remembered of all promotions operating in the Vancouver area before or since. The promotion began coming into its own around the time CHAN-TV began broadcasting their TV program (also called All Star Wrestling) in 1962, when Gene Kiniski arrived in Vancouver and became a regular on the roster. At the time All Star began, the NWA British Empire heavyweight title was the top singles title in the Vancouver territory, while the Pacific Coast tag team title initially served as the tag team championship (both titles were carried over from Big Time Wrestling); however, after the British Empire title was abandoned sometime after 1963 (when Kiniski last won it), All Star had no singles title of its own until 1970, when the Pacific Coast heavyweight title (which was first introduced in 1948 in Big Time Wrestling, but became inactive around 1958) was reactivated.

Kiniski/Kovacs era (1968–1977)
All Star started becoming a serious force in the Pacific Northwest wrestling scene during Kiniski's reign as NWA World Heavyweight champion (which he won from Lou Thesz in 1966), when he and Sandor Kovacs, along with Portland promoter Don Owen, joined forces to promote the territory at the start of 1968, forming Northwest Wrestling Promotions as the parent company to run All Star. During this time, the promotion shared talent (including many of the sport's big names of the time) with Owen's nearby NWA affiliate Pacific Northwest Wrestling while also developing local talent. At the same time, the All Star Wrestling program began to be seen across Canada via syndication. Ron Morrier was the original host of the TV show and served in that capacity until his death on August 6, 1981; after that, former CFUN disk jockey Ed Karl took over as the host for the remainder of the show's run on CHAN-TV.

Al Tomko era (1977–1989)
Kovacs promoted his final All Star show on January 17, 1977, before selling his share in the promotion to Al Tomko, a veteran wrestler and former Winnipeg promoter for the AWA. While the promotion managed to hold steady through the late-1970s following the sale, All Star began going into decline by the early-1980s, due partly to the aging Tomko (who was physically past his prime and had poor wrestling skills) pushing himself as the company's top star, and partly to the rise of the WWF around the middle of the decade (a situation which actually affected many other North American promotions besides All Star). Late in the promotion's NWA affiliation, during episodes of All Star Wrestling, Tomko and Ed Karl would also present and commentate on highlight clips of matches from fellow NWA affiliates Central States Wrestling and Jim Crockett Promotions, as well as matches taped at All Star's main house shows in Vancouver and Cloverdale.

Noticing the decline of the promotion, Kiniski sold his ownership stake and got out sometime around 1983, after which he began promoting shows in Vancouver in association with Stampede Wrestling and the AWA. In late 1985, Tomko withdrew All Star from the NWA and created a new sanctioning body for the company called the Universal Wrestling Alliance; those changes did nothing to reverse All Star's fortunes, however, and the promotion would eventually cease operations, holding its final event in Elk Grove, British Columbia on July 2, 1989. Mauro Ranallo, who went on to become a radio announcer for Abbotsford station CFVR (now CKQC-FM) and the TV play-by-play announcer for Pride Fighting Championships, Stampede Wrestling, King of the Cage, KVOS-TV's NWA Top Ranked Wrestling, and most recently WWE Smackdown, got his start as an on-camera personality with All Star Wrestling while still in his teens, late in the show's run.

Alumni

Delta Dawn
Abdullah the Butcher
Al Tomko
André the Giant
The Assassins
The "Atomic Kid" Buddy Wayne
Bobby Bass
Kevin Jefferies
"Bulldog" Bob Brown
The Brute (Bugsy McGraw)
Buzz Grogan
Buzz Tyler
Genie
Wendy Reicher 
JJ Jetson
Crusher von Haig (Road Warrior Hawk)
Dale Lewis (wrestler)
Dean Ho
The Idols
"Diamond" Timothy Flowers
Don Jardine
Don Leo Jonathan
"Gentleman" Jonathan Sayers
Don Morrow (Don Muraco)
Dominic DeNucci
Dutch Savage
Rocky Dellesara
"Dirty" Dan Denton
Bruiser Costa
"Blackjack" Hoss Taylor
Sonny Myers
Dennis Stamp
Terry "The Ripper" Rivera

David Schultz
Eddie Morrow
Mike Allen
"Wildthing" Steve Ray
Erich Froelich
Mike Roselli
The A-team
The Blue Angel
The Fabulous Kangaroos
Flash Gordon
The Frog (Terry Tomko)
Athol Foley
J.R. Foley
The Flying Peacock
Gama Singh
Gerry Morrow
Gidget
Gene Kiniski
"Gorgeous" Michelle Starr
Hard Boiled Haggerty
Haystacks Calhoun
The Honky Tonk Man
The Iron Sheik
Jake Roberts
Jay Youngblood
Dr. Jerry Graham
Corey Collins
John Quinn
Billy Two Eagles
Big John Tenta
Mike Palace
The Great Dave Scott

Jimmy Snuka
John Tolos
Kinji Shibuya
King Kong JR Bundy
Killer Kowalski
Joe Martin
Bobby Jones
Klondike Mike
Mark Lewin
Doug McCoil
Igor Volkoff 
Stacy Carter
The Iron Maiden
The Mighty I-Ton
Mike Sharpe
Mike Edwards
Mike Webster
Masa Saito
Moondog Mayne
Moose Morowski
Neil Drummond/The Wizard
Todd "Ole" Olsen/Thor/Thor "The Body" Olsen
Mauro Ranallo
"Playboy" Buddy Rose
Rick Davis (Todd Tomko)
Rick Martel
Rick Patterson
Ron Starr
Harley the Nightrider
Ricky Hunter
Rick Rude
Denuda The Polish Princess

Ivan Gorky
Dale Housten
Mad Dog Rex
Chris Colt
Terry Adonis
American Ninja
Avalanche Tyler
Randy Taylor
Rip Oliver
Ed Karl
Joe Cagle
The Robotrons (Craig Bresett and Fabio Chiesa)
Rocky Johnson
Roddy Piper
Salvatore Martino
The Samoans
Scotty the Body
Sean Regan
Siegfried Steinke
The BC Blondes
The Sheepherders
Snake Williams
Stan Stasiak
Steven Little Bear
Tiger Jeet Singh
Tony Borne
"Vicious" Verne Siebert 
"Tiger" Dory Signh
Whipper Billy Watson
Mr. X (Guy Mitchell)
Shalimar

Championships

NWA-sanctioned championships

UWA-sanctioned championships

See also
List of National Wrestling Alliance territories
List of independent wrestling promotions in Canada

References

External links
All Star Wrestling forum at Kayfabe Memories
NWA All Star Wrestling title histories
Vance Nevada's Canadian Wrestling Results Archive

1960s establishments in British Columbia
Canadian professional wrestling promotions
National Wrestling Alliance members
Professional wrestling in British Columbia